The Society for the Preservation of Historic Buildings of the United Kingdom was founded initially as a pressure group to counter the demolition of historic buildings and it resolved later to acquire historically significant properties in order to maintain and protect them itself.

In a 2007 merger, the goodwill of the Society was acquired by a registered Nonprofit organisation, Ruins on the Roam Limited, which adopted the Society's name and assets, with the intention to continue its work. The Society is noted in an architectural journal of 1969. The Society was dissolved in 2011 after folding due to the dwindling of financial support during the most recent global recession.

See also
 Historic preservation

References

External links
 Organization homepage

Architecture in the United Kingdom
Architectural history
Heritage organisations in the United Kingdom